Sir Neville Guthrie Trotter , FCIT (born 27 January 1932) is a retired British Conservative politician.

Early life and career

Trotter was the son of Captain Alexander Trotter and Elizabeth Winifred Trotter (née Guthrie). He was educated at Shrewsbury School and King's College, Durham (BCom).

Prior to becoming an MP, Trotter served as a Conservative councillor for Dene ward in Newcastle upon Tyne, which covered the northern areas of Heaton, parts of Benton and the well-known Freeman Hospital. Trotter was a member of Newcastle City Council from 1963 to 1974, and Tyne and Wear Metropolitan Council from 1973 to 1974. In 1973, he was a Justice of the Peace in Newcastle.

Parliamentary career
Trotter fought the safe Labour seat of Consett in 1970, but came a distant second to the incumbent, David Watkins.

Trotter was elected as MP for Tynemouth at the February 1974 general election until he retired at the 1997 election.

As an MP, he served on the Transport Committee from 9 June 1983 until his retirement in March 1997. He was also a member of the Expenditure Committee (1978-1979) and the Defence Committee (1992-1997).

Although his majorities were not huge, he successfully held on to Tynemouth, never being defeated at the polls. In 1992, the year after the Meadow Well Riots in the constituency, his majority was just under six hundred votes. After his retirement, Tynemouth was won by Labour's Alan Campbell.

Outside Parliament
Trotter was a consultant at Thornton Baker from 1974 to 1983, and at Grant Thornton, Chartered Accountants from 1983 to 2005.

Honours
Trotter was made a knight 1997, the same year he became a deputy lieutenant. He became a Fellow of the Royal Aeronautical Society in 1998. Trotter is also a Fellow of the Institute of Chartered Accountants in England & Wales and the Chartered Institute of Transport. He was made a Freeman of the City of London in 1978. In April 2004, Trotter was appointed High Sheriff of Tyne and Wear.

Personal life
In 1983, he married Caroline, daughter of the late Captain John Farrow, OBE, RN and Oona Farrow (née Hall). Trotter and his wife had a daughter.

Trotter's recreations are aviation, gardening, fell-walking, the study of foreign affairs, defence and industry. He is a member of the Royal Air Force and Northern Counties (Newcastle upon Tyne) clubs.

References

Times Guide to the House of Commons, Times Newspapers Limited, 1992 and 1997 editions.

External links
 

1932 births
Living people
Conservative Party (UK) MPs for English constituencies
Knights Bachelor
UK MPs 1974
UK MPs 1974–1979
UK MPs 1979–1983
UK MPs 1983–1987
UK MPs 1987–1992
UK MPs 1992–1997
Deputy Lieutenants of Tyne and Wear
High Sheriffs of Tyne and Wear